Sergei Anatolyevich Pereshivalov (born 23 October 1983) is a former Russian professional footballer.

Club career
He made his debut in the Russian Premier League in 2002 for FC Torpedo-ZIL Moscow.

External links
 

1983 births
Footballers from Moscow
Living people
Russian footballers
Association football midfielders
FC Moscow players
Russian Premier League players